Frings may refer to:
Frings, a combo of french fries and onion rings at Harvey's fast food restaurants
Frings were served at Jack in the Box in the 1980s for a short time

People 
 Torsten Frings (born 1976), German footballer
 Josef Frings (1887–1978), German Roman Catholic bishop
 Ketti Frings (1909–1981), US-American writer
 Matthias Frings (born 1953), German writer and journalist

Disambiguation pages with surname-holder lists